The following is a list of squads for all twelve national teams that competed at the 2017 UEFA European Under-21 Championship. Each national team had to submit a final squad of 23 players, three of whom had to be goalkeepers.

Players in boldface were capped at full international level prior to the start of the tournament.

Age, caps, goals and club as of 16 June 2017.

Group A

England
Head coach: Aidy Boothroyd

Poland
Poland named their final squad on 2 June 2017.
Head coach: Marcin Dorna

Slovakia
Head coach: Pavel Hapal

Sweden
Sweden named their final squad on 30 May 2017. On 6 June 2017, defender Pa Konate was ruled out of the tournament after a thigh injury, and was replaced by defender Egzon Binaku.

Head coach: Håkan Ericson

Group B

North Macedonia
Head coach: Blagoja Milevski

Portugal
Head coach: Rui Jorge

Serbia
Head coach: Nenad Lalatović

Spain
Head coach: Albert Celades

Group C

Czech Republic
Head coach: Vítězslav Lavička

Denmark
Head coach: Niels Frederiksen

Germany
Head coach: Stefan Kuntz

Jonathan Tah withdrew from the squad due to injury and was replaced by Waldemar Anton.

Italy
Italy named their final squad on 6 June 2017.

Head coach: Luigi Di Biagio

Player statistics
Player representation by league

References

Squads
UEFA European Under-21 Championship squads